Shpëtim is an Albanian masculine given name and may refer to:
Shpëtim Babaj (born 1981), Kosovar footballer
Shpëtim Duro (born 1959), Albanian football coach
Shpëtim Hasani (born 1982), Kosovar footballer 
Shpëtim Idrizi (born 1967), Albanian politician
Shpëtim Moçka (born 1989), Albanian footballer 

Albanian masculine given names